Clara Harrington "Clare" Copeman (nee Proctor; 6 June 1923 — June 2019) was an Australian tennis player.

Proctor twice made the singles quarter-finals at the Australian Championships and was runner-up in the mixed doubles in 1951, partnering Jack May. She made the singles third round at her only Wimbledon appearance in 1951 and during the same European tour teamed up with Nancye Bolton to win a doubles title in Oslo.

Grand Slam finals

Mixed doubles: 1 (0–1)

References

1923 births
2019 deaths
Australian female tennis players